Anzhen Subdistrict is a subdistrict on the northwest portion of Chaoyang District, Beijing, China. As of 2020, it has a total population of 57,016.

The subdistrict got its name from Anzhenmen, a former city gate of Khanbaliq.

History

Administrative Division 
As of 2021, there are 10 communities under the subdistrict:

Landmark 

 Xihuang Temple

References 

Chaoyang District, Beijing
Subdistricts of Beijing